Lella Kmar  (1862 – 31 December 1942) was the queen consort of Tunisia during three reigns, after having successively married three beys of Tunisia: Muhammad III Sadiq, Ali III and Muhammad V Nasir, and despite this, she did not have children.

Early life (1862–1875) 
The Ottoman custom was to allocate a wing for female servants, concubines, or captives bought from slave markets, or captured in wars and invasions, or to presented as gifts. This is what happened with Lella Kmar of the Circassian origin who was born in the Ottoman Imperial Harem in 1862 and was given by the Ottoman Sultan, Abdul Hamid II to the Bey of Tunis in that period Muhammad III Sadiq and that was around 1875.

Coming to Tunisia and first reign (1875–1882) 
After she came to Tunisia and was placed on the list of female odalisques, she married nearly two years later from Muhammad III Sadiq in 1877 and lived with him for five years in a somewhat parental relationship because he was about 50 years older than her until his death in the year 1882 and that after he signed on the Bardo Treaty that established the French protectorate in Tunisia.

Second reign (1883–1902) 
After the death of Muhammad III, his brother, the new bey (Ali III), ordered to transfer her from Ksar Said Palace to his palace in La Marsa, so she married Ali III, the crown prince of her ex-husband in 1883. She was then twenty years old in that period. This marriage lasted for twenty years, in which she managed to increase her role in the affairs of the state, as she advised her husband in political affairs, especially that Tunisia during that period had fallen in French colonialism and it is said that the Bey admired her intelligence, acumen and speed of her intuition, which made her interfere in many appointments inside the state until her marriage ended for the second time, with the death of Ali III on 11 June 1902.

Isolation and straying from power (1902–1906) 
After her widowhood, Lella Kmar was treated badly under the sight of the new Bey, her stepson Muhammad IV Hadi, who was the son of her second husband, Ali III. Muhammad IV removed her from La Marsa Palace, so she went to live in a small apartment, even her visit was forbidden. This situation lasted for four years until the death of the Bey in 1906.

Third reign (1906–1922) 

After Muhammad V Nasir's ascension to the throne in 1906, she was rehabilitated until the latter married her in 1908.
In his reign, she became the undisputed ruler of the palace, as the Bey was interested in her, and he issued an official decree affirming her protection and ceasing to harm her and not infringing on her and her rights. He also allocated a salary for her and challenged a list of all her expenses.

This power enabled her to establish relationships with personalities outside the royal palace in Tunisia, during that time she met Princess Nazli Fazil, who is a descendant of the dynasty of Muhammad Ali of Egypt (Royal Family of Egypt) and the wife of Khelil Bouhageb who will become the Prime minister of the Kingdom of Tunisia. Lella Kmar was eager to know her after what Nasir Bey told her about when he saw her for the first time during the reception she and her husband held to celebrate the arrival of Muhammad Abduh to Tunisia in 1903.

But what Muhammad V did most to honor his wife was her dedication of the Essaada Palace in La Marsa that he specifically built for her between 1914 and 1915, that is, in the midst of the First World War.

Just as Lella Kmar was the center of the advice of Ali III, the situation was with Muhammad V, and this situation continued until his death on 8 July 1922 and she was around 60 years old at the time.

Later life (1922–1942) 

After the death of her third husband and his cousins Muhammad VI Habib and Ahmad II assumed the throne, she retracted a little from rule, but she had taken all her rights thanks to what was issued by Muhammad V in addition to that she lived in her palace, which he built for her as he was over her property and was not on the list of properties of the Bey.

Since she had no children from her husbands, she raised Chedly Haidar, the child of another odalisque. Haydar, the last Mayor of Tunis under the Husainid dynasty, inherited and occupied the Essaada Palace until 1953, when he gave it to the Tunisian State.

After the death of Ahmad II, her stepson, Muhammad VII Munsif (son of Muhammad V Nasir), assumed the throne, and the latter was unlike her other stepson, Muhammad IV Hadi, when respect was due to her and she was 80 years old at the time. It is said that the coronation of Muhammad VII took place inside the bedroom of Lella Kmar in the Esaada Palace instead of the Bardo Palace officially. This is because Lella Kmar was his father's wife who raised him since his childhood so she had ordered to crown him in her room due to her health condition and was unable to move to Bardo.

Weeks later, she died on the night of December 30, 1942, and was buried in Tourbet Al Haydar in the Jellaz Cemetery the next day.

See also
Bey of Tunis
Lalla Beya
Beylik of Tunis
Kingdom of Tunisia
First Lady of Tunisia

External links

References 

1862 births
1942 deaths
Tunisian royalty
Tunisian women
Tunisian people of Circassian descent
20th-century Tunisian people